Harry Ruskin (1894–1969) was an American screenwriter and lyricist. He worked for a variety of Hollywood studios over the course of several decades. For MGM he co-wrote several entries in the Andy Hardy and Dr. Kildare series. He wrote the lyrics for the 1929 hit song "I May Be Wrong (but I Think You're Wonderful)". In a 2020 interview, former Golden-Age-of-Hollywood child actress Cora Sue Collins alleged, when she was 15 years-old, Ruskin, then 55 years-old, tried to force her to have sex with him in exchange for a good movie role{{cite web|url=https://www.yahoo.com/now/former-30s-child-star-cora-130059948.html.  she refused and told Louis B. Mayer about what had happened, who was nonchalant and dismissive about it.

Selected filmography

 King of Jazz (1930)
 Smoke Lightning (1933)
 Too Much Harmony (1933)
 Six of a Kind (1934)
 Two for Tonight (1935)
 The Glass Key (1935)
 Lady Be Careful (1936)
 Great Guy (1936)
 The Big Noise (1936)
 Bad Guy (1937)
 The Hit Parade (1937)
 Beg, Borrow or Steal (1937)
 The Women Men Marry (1937)
 Married Before Breakfast (1937)
 Young Dr. Kildare (1938)
 Paradise for Three (1938)
 Love Is a Headache (1938)
 Honolulu (1939)
 Miracles for Sale (1939)
 The Secret of Dr. Kildare (1939)
 Calling Dr. Kildare (1939)
 Dr. Kildare's Strange Case (1940)
 Keeping Company (1940)
 Dr. Kildare Goes Home (1940)
 Dr. Kildare's Crisis (1940)
 The Ghost Comes Home (1940)
 Dr. Kildare's Wedding Day (1941)
 Andy Hardy's Private Secretary (1941)
 The People vs. Dr. Kildare (1941)
 The Penalty (1941)
 Dr. Kildare's Victory (1942)
 This Time for Keeps (1942)
 Tish (1942)
 Calling Dr. Gillespie (1942)
 Dr. Gillespie's New Assistant (1942)
 Dr. Gillespie's Criminal Case (1943)
 Rationing (1944)
 Andy Hardy's Blonde Trouble (1944)
 Lost in a Harem (1944)
 Barbary Coast Gent (1944)
 Three Men in White (1944)
 The Hidden Eye (1945)
 Between Two Women (1945)
 Love Laughs at Andy Hardy (1946)
 The Postman Always Rings Twice (1946)
 Dark Delusion (1947)
 Tenth Avenue Angel (1948)
 Julia Misbehaves (1948)
 Watch the Birdie (1950)
 The Happy Years (1950)
 Lady Godiva of Coventry (1955)
 The Girl in the Kremlin (1957)
 Andy Hardy Comes Home (1958)

References

Bibliography
 Dietz, Dan. The Complete Book of 1920s Broadway Musicals. Rowman & Littlefield, 2019.
 Scott, Ian. In Capra's Shadow: The Life and Career of Screenwriter Robert Riskin. University Press of Kentucky, 2014.

External links

1894 births
1969 deaths
American screenwriters
People from Cincinnati